The 1987 Rheindahlen bombing was a car bomb attack on 23 March 1987 at JHQ Rheindahlen military barracks, the British Army headquarters in West Germany, injuring thirty-one. The large 300 lb (140 kg) car bomb exploded near the visitors officers' mess of the barracks. The Provisional IRA later stated it had carried out the bombing. It was the second bombing in Rheindahlen, the first being in 1973, and the start of the IRA's campaign on mainland Europe from the late 1980s to the early 1990s. Although British soldiers were targeted, most of the injured were actually German officers and their wives.

Background

Other than attacks in Northern Ireland and England the Provisional IRA also carried out attacks in other countries such as West Germany, Belgium, and the Netherlands, where British soldiers were based. Between 1979 and 1990, eight unarmed soldiers and six civilians died in these attacks. It was the first IRA attack in West Germany since a British Army officer, Colonel Mark Coe, was shot dead by an IRA unit outside his home in, Bielefeld in February 1980. Coe's assassination was one of the first high-profile killings by the IRA in Germany and on mainland Europe. A year before, British Ambassador to the Netherlands Sir Richard Sykes was assassinated, whilst four British soldiers were hurt in the 1979 Brussels bombing in Belgium, just one day after the killing of Lord Mountbatten and the Warrenpoint ambush, which killed 18 British soldiers. In November 1981 the Irish National Liberation Army (INLA) bombed a British Army base in Herford, West Germany. There were no injuries in the attack. There was also a mortar attack on British Army base in Germany in 1996.

According to author Ed Moloney's "The Secret History of the IRA", IRA Chief of Staff Kevin McKenna before the capture of the Eksund (a ship that was to ship heavy weaponry to the IRA from Libya) envisaged a three-pronged offensive that would start in Northern Ireland and then spread to British targets in mainland Europe.

The bombing
The IRA planted a 300-pound car bomb inside JHQ Rheindahlen, near the officers' mess. When the large car bomb exploded 31 people were injured, some of them badly. Twenty-seven West Germans and four Britons were hurt in the bombing at 22:30 local time. Rheindahlen was a major British military base in West Germany, with more than 12,000 service personnel being stationed there. It was the headquarters of both the British Army of the Rhine and Royal Air Force Germany (RAF Rheindahlen).

The force of the blast ripped up the road and caused extensive damage to parked cars and surrounding buildings. The injured were taken to the RAF hospital at Wegberg, a few miles south of Rheindahlen, near the Dutch border. The bomb caused parts of the ceiling to collapse and doors were ripped from their frames. A police spokesman said the blast blew out windows in buildings several hundred yards away.

It looked like it was a reasonably successful attack from the IRA's point of view but the IRA actually had a close escape. The only reason people had not been killed was that the IRA ASU was unable to position the car bomb closer to the mess, because the car park was full of vehicles. Unknown to the IRA unit, most of the vehicles were owned by West German military officers who had been invited to spend a social evening with their British counterparts. Had the IRA's operation plan been carried out fully many of these German officers could have been killed and the start of the IRA's Europe campaign would have been a diplomatic and military disaster and a big blow to any of the IRA's international support.

Aftermath
The IRA later said it had carried out the bombing of the Rheindahlen barracks. A statement from the IRA said: "Our unit's brief was to inflict a devastating blow but was ordered to be careful to avoid civilian casualties."

The National Democratic Front for the Liberation of West Germany, a previously unheard of group, also claimed to have been behind the attack, but this was dismissed by police investigators.

The British Army of the Rhine was renamed British Forces Germany (BFG) in 1994.

See also
Osnabrück mortar attack
Glamorgan Barracks bombing
1988 IRA attacks in the Netherlands

References

Explosions in 1987
1987 in West Germany
20th century in Mönchengladbach
Provisional IRA bombings in continental Europe
British forces in Germany
20th-century history of the British Army
1980s in North Rhine-Westphalia
1987 in military history
Military actions and engagements during the Troubles (Northern Ireland)
Crime in North Rhine-Westphalia
March 1987 events in Europe
1987 crimes in Germany
Attacks on military installations in the 1980s
Car and truck bombings in Europe
Rhein